The Roman Catholic Archdiocese of Windhoek is the Metropolitan See for the Ecclesiastical province of Windhoek in Namibia. The predecessor to the current Archdiocese, the Prefecture Apostolic of Cimbebasia, was established in 1892 and the current archdiocese was fully erected in March 1994.
The current archbishop is Liborius Ndumbukuti Nashenda.

History
 August 1, 1892: Established as Apostolic Prefecture of Lower Cimbebasia from the Apostolic Prefecture of Cimbebasia in Angola
 January 10, 1921: Renamed as Apostolic Prefecture of Cimbebasia
 May 11, 1926: Promoted as Apostolic Vicariate of Windhoek
 March 14, 1994: Promoted as Metropolitan Archdiocese of Windhoek

Special churches

 The cathedral is St. Mary's Cathedral in Windhoek.

Bishops
 Prefect Apostolic of Lower Cimbebasia (Roman rite)
 Fr. Bernard Pierre Herrmann, O.M.I. (1892 – 1901)
 Fr. Augustine Nachtwey, O.M.I. (1901.12 – 1908)
 Fr. Joseph Schemmer, O.M.I. (1908.11.24 – 1909.12.17)
 Fr. Eugène Klaeylé, O.M.I. (1909.12.18 – 1921.01.10)
 Prefect Apostolic of Cimbebasia (Roman rite)
 Fr. Joseph Gotthardt, O.M.I. (1921.01.11 – 1926.05.11); see below''''
 Vicars Apostolic of Windhoek (Roman rite)
 Bishop Joseph Gotthardt, O.M.I. (1926.05.11 – 1961.03.20); see above 
 Bishop Rudolf Johannes Maria Koppmann, O.M.I. (1961.03.20 – 1980.11.29)
 Bishop Bonifatius Haushiku, I.C.P. (1980.11.29 – 1994.03.14): see below Archbishops of Windhoek (Roman rite)
 Archbishop Bonifatius Haushiku, I.C.P. (1994.03.14 – 2002.06.12); see above''
 Archbishop Liborius Ndumbukuti Nashenda, O.M.I. (since 2004.09.21)

Coadjutor Vicar Apostolic
Rudolf Johannes Maria Koppmann, O.M.I. (1957-1961)

Auxiliary Bishops
Liborius Ndumbukuti Nashenda, O.M.I. (1998-2004), appointed Archbishop here
Bonifatius Haushiku, I.C.P. (1978-1980), appointed Vicar Apostolic here

Suffragan dioceses
 Keetmanshoop
 Rundu

See also
Roman Catholicism in Namibia

References

 GCatholic.org
 Catholic Hierarchy
 Archdiocese of Windhoek 

Roman Catholic dioceses in Namibia
Religious organizations established in 1892
Roman Catholic dioceses and prelatures established in the 19th century
Christian organizations established in 1994
Windhoek
A